Juan Carlos Orellana Jara (21 June 1955 – 10 November 2022) was a Chilean footballer who played as a left winger.

Career
In 1987, he played abroad in Canada's National Soccer League with Chile Lindo.

Personal life and death
Orellana suffered amyotrophic lateral sclerosis and died on 10 November 2022, at the age of 67.

Honours
Colo-Colo
 Chilean Primera División 1979

References

External links
 Juan Carlos Orellana at PartidosdeLaRoja.com 

1955 births
2022 deaths
Footballers from Santiago
Chilean footballers
Association football wingers
Chile international footballers
1983 Copa América players
Chilean Primera División players
Primera B de Chile players
Canadian National Soccer League players
Deportes Temuco footballers
Colo-Colo footballers
O'Higgins F.C. footballers
Unión Española footballers
C.D. Antofagasta footballers
Unión San Felipe footballers
Chilean expatriate footballers
Chilean expatriate sportspeople in Canada
Expatriate soccer players in Canada
Deaths from motor neuron disease 
Neurological disease deaths in Chile